Aslak Nore  (born 12 May 1978) is a Norwegian journalist, publisher, non-fiction and crime fiction writer.

He was born in Oslo, and is a son of writer Kjartan Fløgstad. He made his literary debut in 2007, with the novel Gud er norsk. Later books are Ekstremistan (2009), En norsk spion (2012), Oslo Noir (2014), and the espionage thriller Ulvefellen (2017). For Ulvefellen, he was awarded the Riverton Prize in 2017.

Bibliography
 Havets kirkegård, Aschehoug (2021) 
 Ulvefellen, Aschehoug (2017)
Oslo Noir, Aschehoug (Litteraturåret 2014)
 En norsk spion (Litteraturåret 2012)
 Ekstremistan: Frykt og håp i det flerkulturelle Norge (Litteraturåret 2009)
 Gud er norsk: Soldatene fra fredsnasjonen (Litteraturåret 2007)

References

1978 births
Living people
Writers from Oslo
Norwegian non-fiction writers
Norwegian male novelists
Norwegian crime fiction writers
21st-century Norwegian novelists
21st-century Norwegian male writers
Male non-fiction writers